Epadrianites is a genus of the Adrianitidae family. They are an extinct group of ammonoid, which are shelled cephalopods related to squids, belemnites, octopuses, and cuttlefish, and more distantly to the nautiloids.

References

 The Paleobiology Database - Epadrianites accessed on 18 November 2010

Adrianitidae
Permian ammonites
Goniatitida genera
Prehistoric animals of Asia